Charniodiscus is an Ediacaran fossil that in life was probably a stationary filter feeder that lived anchored to a sandy sea bed. The organism had a holdfast, stalk and frond. The holdfast was bulbous shaped, and the stalk was flexible. The frond was segmented and had a pointed tip. While the organism superficially resembles the sea pens (cnidaria), it is probably not a crown-group animal.

Charniodiscus was first found in Charnwood Forest in England, and named by Trevor D. Ford in 1958. The name is derived from the fact that Ford described a holdfast consisting only of a double concentric circle, his species being named Charniodiscus concentricus. Later it was discovered that a frond (Charnia masoni) was part of a closely related organism. Charnia differs in the branching structure in the frond.

Species are distinguished by the number of segments, the presence or absence of distal spines, and by shape ratios.

Other described species, C. arboreus, C. longus, C. oppositus, and C. spinosus are later considered to belong to own genus Arborea, which is once considered as synonymous with Charniodiscus. Status of C. yorgensis needs restudy.

See also
List of Ediacaran genera

References 
Glaessner, M. F., and Daily, B. (1959) "The Geology and Late Precambrian Fauna of the Ediacara Fossil Reserve". Records of the South Australian Museum 13: 369-407 retrieved 26 January 2008

External links
Mistaken Point
MORPHOMETRIC ANALYSIS abstract

Ediacaran life
Enigmatic prehistoric animal genera
Ediacaran Europe
White Sea fossils